Consciousness is a 2009 book by Christopher S. Hill, in which the author offers explanations of six forms of consciousness: agent consciousness, propositional consciousness, introspective consciousness, relational consciousness, phenomenal consciousness, and experiential consciousness.

Reception
The book has been reviewed by Joseph Levine, Fred Dretske, Daniel Stoljar, 
Adam Pautz, Ellen Fridland, Erhan Demircioglu and Gabriel Jucá.

References

External links 
 Consciousness

2009 non-fiction books
Cambridge University Press books
Books about consciousness
Philosophy of mind literature